James Herbert Gustavus Meredyth Somerville, 2nd Baron Athlumney, 2nd Baron Meredyth (23 March 1865 – 8 January 1929) was an Irish peer and officer of the British Army.

Early life and background
He was the son of William Meredyth Somerville, 1st Baron Athlumney and Maria Georgiana Elizabeth Jones, was baptised on 25 April 1865 at Kentstown, County Meath, Ireland, and was educated at Harrow School, Harrow on the Hill, London, England.

He succeeded to his family's titles on the death of his father, the first Baron Athlumney, on 7 December 1873.  He sat in the House of Lords as Baron Meredyth (a UK barony created in 1866 - the barony of Athlumney being Irish).

Military career
Lord Athlumney served firstly in the Prince of Wales's Leinster Regiment (Royal Canadians), before being made extra ADC to the Lord Lieutenant of Ireland (Earl Cadogan). He subsequently served in the Coldstream Guards seeing action in the Dongola Expedition in 1896, where he was mentioned in despatches. After he retired from the regular army, he was appointed captain in the Kent Artillery Militia on 27 January 1897. Following the outbreak of the Second Boer War in late 1899, he again volunteered for active service, leaving Southampton for South Africa on the SS Tantallon Castle in early March 1900. In South Africa he served as staff officer to the Military Governor of Pretoria. He resigned from the Artillery Militia on 30 April 1902. He was appointed a Captain in the Reserve of Officers on 25 July 1902.

During the First World War, he served as Assistant Provost Marshal of London District.

Family
On 30 July 1919 he married Margery Boan, daughter of Henry Boan, at Wellington Barracks, Guards Chapel, Westminster, London, England.

He died on 8 January 1929, at age 63, at Somerville, County Meath, Ireland, without lawful issue.  He did however have a son, David Peter (1 March 1919 – 8 August 2001) with Margery's sister Enid.  On his death, his Baronies became extinct while his Baronetcy became dormant.

References

1865 births
1929 deaths
Prince of Wales's Leinster Regiment officers
People from County Meath
People educated at Harrow School
Barons in the Peerage of Ireland
2
Coldstream Guards officers
British Army personnel of World War I
British Army personnel of the Second Boer War
James
Younger sons of barons